Édith Audibert (born 7 March 1948) is a French Republican politician who became a Member of the National Assembly in 2020, representing Var's 3rd constituency.

On 26 April 2022, she announced that she wouldn't seek re-election in the 2022 election.

References 

Living people
1948 births
People from Hyères
21st-century French women politicians
21st-century French politicians
The Republicans (France) politicians
Deputies of the 15th National Assembly of the French Fifth Republic
Women members of the National Assembly (France)
Members of Parliament for Var